Charlene Lipsey (born July 16, 1991) is an American middle-distance runner who specializes in the 800 metres. She competed in the women's 800 metres at the 2017 World Championships in Athletics.

Professional
Charlene Lipsey signed with Adidas in 2013 and trained at LSU until Fall 2016.

Lipsey moved to train with Philadelphia based Juventus Running Club and coach Derek Thompson.

Track star Charlene Lipsey received key to Hempstead Village in September 2017 from Mayor Don Ryan.

Charlene Lipsey was part of Team USA setting world indoor record in the February 3 at 2018 Millrose Games in 8:05.89 – Chrishuna Williams (2:05.10), Raevyn Rogers (2:00.45), Charlene Lipsey (2:01.98), Ajee' Wilson (1:58.37).

Charlene Lipsey won 2018 Sir Walter Miler in 4:27.28 in the same race Sara Vaughn, Cory McGee, Nicole Sifuentes, Kate Van Buskirk ran under 4:30.

USA National Track and field Championships

NCAA
For college, Lipsey chose to compete for the LSU Tigers track and field where she was an 8-Time All-American, Three-Time SEC Champion.

Lipsey graduated from Louisiana State University in 2013.

High school
Lipsey won 2009 New York State Public High School Athletic Association 1A state 800 meters outdoor title in 2:08.67 & Lipsey won 2008 New York State Public High School Athletic Association 1A state 800 meters outdoor title in 2:07.46. Lipsey is a graduate of Hempstead High School (New York) where she was a record-setting 800 meters, 1500 meters and mile.

References

External links
 
 
 
 

1991 births
Living people
American female middle-distance runners
World Athletics Championships athletes for the United States
Sportspeople from New York (state)
African-American female track and field athletes
Track and field athletes from New York (state)
LSU Tigers track and field athletes
Louisiana State University alumni
Hempstead (village), New York
USA Indoor Track and Field Championships winners
21st-century African-American women
21st-century African-American sportspeople